The County of Champagne, or County of Champagne and Brie, was a historic territory and feudal principality in France descended from the early medieval kingdom of Austrasia. The county became part of the crown lands due to the marriage of Queen Joan I of Navarre, who was the countess of Champagne, and King Philip IV of France.

History 
The county reached its peak as one of the richest and strongest of the French principalities during the rule of Henry I. The court of Champagne became a renowned literary center, and the county hosted the Champagne fairs at their height. The countship passed to the French crown in 1314, forming the province of Champagne.

See also
 Count of Champagne

References

External links

Counties of France